St. George's Anglican Church is a church in St. Catharines, Ontario, Canada. It was first established in 1792. In 1836, the church was destroyed by a fire and was rebuilt in 1840.

References

Further reading

External links 
 

Buildings and structures in St. Catharines
Anglican church buildings in Ontario
19th-century Anglican church buildings in Canada